Arthur Mann (1948–1999) was a Scottish footballer and manager

Arthur Mann may also refer to:

Arthur Mann (rugby league), English rugby league player
Arthur Mann (Australian footballer) (1889–1949), Australian rules footballer
Arthur Henry Mann (1850–1929), English organist and composer
Arthur Henry Mann (journalist) (1876–1972), British newspaper journalist
Arthur L. Mann Memorial Library, public library in West Paris, Maine

See also
Art Mann, American television presenter